The 2015 La Tropicale Amissa Bongo was the tenth edition of the La Tropicale Amissa Bongo road cycling stage race held in Gabon. It was held between 16 and 22 February 2015. It was rated a 2.1 event and was part of the 2015 UCI Africa Tour. The race is therefore the highest ranked stage race in Africa.

The race is known for bringing amateur African cycling teams together with professional teams from Europe.  had dominated the recent editions of the race, having won every edition between 2010 and 2014. The 2014 champion was Natnael Berhane, the first African to win the event, but he was not selected to defend his title. His teammate Yohann Gène was chosen to lead  instead.

The 2015 race consisted of eight stages. These began with difficult, hilly stages in eastern Gabon, before coming to the western coast for several stages suitable for sprinters. There was also a team time trial that took place at night, although the times for this did not play a part in the general classification, because of a delay to the start of the stage. The key stage in the general classification of the 2015 race was stage 1, when a breakaway of three riders escaped and was able to stay away throughout the stage; the same riders made up the final podium. Rafaâ Chtioui won the first and second stages and took the yellow jersey for the overall victory. These were the first professional wins of his career. Chtioui was the first Tunisian to win the overall victory in the race, and the second African. Following his victory, he became the leader of the 2015 UCI Africa Tour rankings.

The other riders to break away on stage 1, Giovanni Bernaudeau and Abdelkader Belmokhtar (Algeria), finished second and third respectively in the general classification. Bernaudeau also won the green and white jersey of the mountains classification. Four of the stages in the race were won by the  team. Three of these were won by Yauheni Hutarovich. The rose jersey of the points classification, however, was won by Yohann Gène, who finished in the top 10 in six stages. The white jersey of the best young rider was won by Bonaventure Uwizeyimana (Rwanda).

Teams 
Fifteen teams were selected to take part in the 2015 edition of the race. Four of these were Professional Continental teams; two were Continental teams; nine were national cycling teams from various African nations.

 
 Gabon (national team)
 Eritrea (national team)
 
 Morocco (national team)
 Rwanda (national team)
 
 Algeria (national team)
 South Africa (national team)
 
 Côte d'Ivoire (national team)
 Cameroon (national team)
 
 Burkina Faso (national team)

Route 

The race was scheduled to be made up of eight stages. Seven of these were road stages, while one was a team time trial. This was the first time a team time trial was included in the race, which also included the hilly eastern portion of Gabon for the first time. The race was therefore expected to be more selective, whereas in the past it had suited sprinters.

Stages

Stage 1 
16 February 2015 — Bongoville to Moanda, 

Stage 1 was a  route from Bongoville to Moanda. On a hot and sunny day, Rafaâ Chtioui, Abdelkader Belmokhtar (Algeria), Giovanni Bernaudeau formed a breakaway in the twenty-ninth kilometre. Chtioui dropped his companions on a difficult and hilly course, coming home nearly two minutes ahead of the other breakaway riders and three minutes ahead of the peloton, giving him a large advantage in the general classification. This was the first time that an African rider had won the first stage of the race.

Stage 2 
17 February 2015 — Okondja to Franceville, 

Stage 2 was a  route from Okondja to Franceville. The course was generally flat, with no significant climbs.

The break of the day was formed by Janvier Hadi (Rwanda), Clint Hendricks (South Africa) and Herman Yemeli (Cameroon). Hendricks and Yemeli were caught with approximately  remaining, but Hadi had attacked and was able to remain in front alone. In the final kilometres, he was caught by Azzedine Lagab (Algeria), who had attacked the peloton. , however, controlled the peloton and were able to bring the pair back with  remaining and set up race leader Rafaâ Chtioui for the sprint. Despite a strong sprint from Yohann Gène, Chtioui won the group sprint to take his second stage victory and extend his lead in the overall classification.

Abdelkader Belmokhtar (Algeria), who had been in second place after the first stage, finished in a group 41 seconds behind the leader. He therefore dropped into third place behind Giovanni Bernaudeau.

Stage 3 
18 February 2015 — Mounana to Koulamoutou, 

Stage 3 was a fairly flat  route from Mounana to Koulamoutou. The race once again took place in very hot conditions.

The break of the day was formed by Salah Eddine Mraouni (Morocco), Tesfom Okubamariam (Eritrea) and Jean Bosco Uwizeyimana (Rwanda). The three riders escaped at the very beginning of the stage.

In the final kilometres, with the breakaway caught,  took control of the peloton. The plan was for Daniel McLay to lead out his teammate Yauheni Hutarovich, but, with  remaining, Hutarovich was not in McLay's wheel, so he decided to sprint for himself. McLay and Hutarovich both contested the sprint, with a video replay necessary to determine which rider had won. McLay's victory was the first by a British rider in La Tropicale Amissa Bongo, and the first professional win of his career.

Stage 4 
19 February 2015 — Ndjolé to Lambaréné, 

The fourth stage was a  route from Ndjolé to Lambaréné.

The breakaway of the day was made by Bryan Nauleau, Benoît Jarrier, Essaïd Abelouache (Morocco) and Adil Barbari (Algeria). They were never able to earn a significant lead. There was another attack with  remaining by Mohammed Errafai (Morocco), and he was able to hold the chasing peloton off until the final .

No other riders were able to catch him as he took 's third stage victory of the race.

Rafaâ Chtioui retained his yellow jersey, while Yohann Gène took over the lead of the points competition.

Stage 5 
20 February 2015 — Lambaréné to Kango, 
Stage 5 was a flat  course from Lambaréné to Kango, held on the same day as stage 6.

The stage was decided in a sprint finish, won by Yauheni Hutarovich, who had finished second in stage 3. Yohann Gène of  finished second in the rose jersey with Tim De Troyer in third. There was no change at the head of the general classification.

Stage 6 
20 February 2015 — Port-Gentil to Port-Gentil, team time trial (TTT)
Stage 6 was a  team time trial around Port-Gentil. The course was almost entirely flat and, unusually, was held at night.

Due to problems with air transport, the stage was delayed by two hours. It was therefore decided that the stage results would not count towards the overall classification.

The first team to set a good time was the national team of the host nation, Gabon, who set a time of 11' 41". The Moroccan team took the lead shortly afterwards and went into the lead with a time of 10' 37". It was expected that , next to finish, would beat this time, but they finished 14" behind. The only other teams to go under 11 minutes were the national teams of Eritrea (who had recently won the African Continental Championships in the discipline) and Rwanda. , with race leader Rafaâ Chtioui, were only able to set the ninth fastest time, over a minute behind the Moroccan team. The biggest team in the race, was even further behind.

As the stage did not count towards the general classification, Chtioui retained his race lead.

Stage 7 
21 February 2015 — Port-Gentil to Port-Gentil, 

The seventh stage was held entirely in Port-Gentil, the economic centre of Gabon. The route was almost entirely flat.

In the sprint finish, Hutarovich opened his sprint with  remaining and was easily able to overcome the other riders – headed by Andrea Palini and Yohann Gène – to take his second victory of the race and the third for his team. Hutarovich raised his arms in celebration before the finish line and in doing so swerved dramatically. Palini claimed that he had been obstructed and that Hutarovich should be relegated, but the race jury disagreed and Hutarovich was awarded the stage win.

Stage 8 
22 February 2015 — Akanda to Libreville, 

The final stage of the 2015 La Tropicale Amissa Bongo was a  route. It started at Cap Estérias on the outskirts of Libreville, running south along the coast to the city centre, where the riders entered a  finishing circuit. After 15 laps of the circuit, they finished the race outside the Lycée National Léon M'Ba.

The first break was formed by Mohammed Errafai (Morocco) and Daniel Teklay (Eritrea). They were joined after  of racing by Yannick Lontsi (Cameroon) and Iboudo Harouna (Burkina Faso). Once again, the stage finished in a bunch sprint and, once again,  were dominant. Yauheni Hutarovich won his third stage of the week, with his team mate and lead-out rider Daniel McLay able to take second place on the stage. Morgan Lamoisson took third place in the sprint.

Chtioui finished in a group 13 seconds behind the leader, but this was did not make a significant difference to his overall lead and he was therefore able to take the overall victory in the race. The one significant change in the final stage was Giovanni Bernaudeau gaining enough mountain points to win the mountains classification.

The prizes were presented after the stage by President Ali Bongo Ondimba and several other members of the Gabonese government. Several famous figures from European cycling were also present, including Laurent Jalabert, Bernard Hinault and Jean-Marie Leblanc, formerly the director of the Tour de France.

Classifications 

There were twelve classifications in the 2015 La Tropicale Amissa Bongo. The leader of each competition was awarded a jersey after each stage to denote their leadership of that classification, which they wore in subsequent stages.

The first and most important classification was the general classification. This was calculated by adding together the times of each rider cumulatively across the eight stages (though the stage 6 team time trial was ultimately excluded), before applying time bonuses. Time bonuses were awarded for the first, second and third placed riders on each stage (10, 6 and 4 seconds respectively) and for the first, second and third placed riders at each intermediate sprint (3, 2 and 1 seconds respectively). The winner of this classification was awarded a yellow jersey and was considered the overall winner of the race.

The points classification was calculated by awarding points to the top 20 riders on each road stage (i.e. excluding the team time trial). The rider with the most points after the race was the winner of the classification and was awarded a pink jersey.

The mountains classification was calculated based on the classified climbs on the road stages. Every climb of the race was classified as a fourth-category climb, all carrying the same number of points: 5, 3 and 1 points to the first three riders to the summit. The winner of this classification was awarded a green jersey with white polka dots.

The first rider in the general classification who was born after 1 January 1992 was considered the winner of the young riders classification. The prize for this competition was a white and blue jersey.

The teams classification was calculated by taking the best three riders on each team on each stage and adding their times together. The team with the lowest cumulative time over the seven road stages plus the team's time in the team time trial (though this was eventually excluded from the calculation) was the winner of the classification. The leading team was awarded white casquettes after each stage and was awarded green and white jerseys after the seventh and eighth stages, though these jerseys were not worn during racing.

There were also six minor classifications. The rider who had scored most points at intermediate sprints was awarded a blue jersey with white polka dots. The best rider on one of the African national teams was awarded a green jersey and the best rider on the Gabonese national team was awarded a blue jersey. The best African team was awarded a beige jersey, though again these were not worn during racing. There was a combativity classification. After each stage, the rider who had made most effort and demonstrated good sportsmanship during each stage was awarded points, and the rider with the most points at the end of the race was awarded a yellow and green jersey. Finally, there was a jersey awarded each day for the Gabonese rider who had been in the longest breakaway; the longest breakaway by a Gabonese rider in the whole race was awarded the jersey after the final stage. This jersey was blue and white, in the Gabonese national colours.

There was also an orange jersey awarded to the winner of each stage, to be worn in the following day's stage.

Major classifications leadership table

Minor classifications winners

References

External links 

La Tropicale Amissa Bongo
La Tropicale Amissa Bongo
La Tropicale Amissa Bongo
La Tropicale Amissa Bongo
February 2015 sports events in Africa